The Drättehorn (also known as Drettenhorn) is a mountain of the Bernese Alps, located north of the Schilthorn in the Bernese Oberland.

References

External links
 Drättehorn on Hikr

Mountains of the Alps
Mountains of Switzerland
Mountains of the canton of Bern
Two-thousanders of Switzerland